The men's long jump event at the 2006 African Championships in Athletics was held at the Stade Germain Comarmond on August 9.

Results

References
Results 
Results

2006 African Championships in Athletics
Long jump at the African Championships in Athletics